Faith Academy, Egbeda is a private Christian secondary school located in Gowon Estate, Egbeda, Nigeria. It was founded in 2010 by Living Faith Church Worldwide.

Former principals 
 Pastor Joseph Alao
 Mr Ishola Ayoade
Principal Emmyh White

References

External links 
 , the school's profile

2010 establishments in Nigeria
Boarding schools in Nigeria
Secondary schools in Oyo State
Educational institutions established in 2010